Mark Damon Espinoza is an American actor currently starring in the NBC series The Endgame.

His first starring role was "Jesse Vasquez" in the TV series Beverly Hills, 90210 from 1993 to 1995. His other credits include stage, television, and film. He is sometimes credited as Mark D. Espinoza.

Early life 
After graduating from college with a degree in Marketing/Economics, he spent two years in the corporate world before changing his career.

Stage 
Espinoza moved to New York City, where he enrolled at the Circle in the Square Theatre School and was awarded a scholarship for music performance.

Regional theatre work eventually brought Espinoza west to the Old Globe Theatre in San Diego. He also performed at The Goodman Theatre in Chicago, Berkeley Rep in California, the Alabama Shakespeare Festival, the Geffen Playhouse in Los Angeles, Portland Center Stage, Missouri Rep and others.

Cabaret work took him to Germany where he performed at The International Theatre of Frankfurt and the Frankfurt Opera House.

He began his professional acting career in the summer of 1983 at Mary Moody Northern Amphitheater in Galveston, TX, where he played Mexican General Santa Ana in the musical "Lone Star."

Television 
Espinoza's breakout role "Jesse Vasquez", the upwardly mobile but cheating husband of Gabrielle Carteris' character Andrea on Beverly Hills, 90210 from 1993 to 1995, quickly established him as an audience favorite at a time when Latin actors were scarce in primetime television.

Espinoza went on to assume the role of "Carlos", Kelly Bundy's clueless boyfriend on the hit television series Married... with Children (2 episodes, 1995–1996). He also played Mexican police detective Alberto Aguilar on The Young and the Restless investigating the possible role of Victor Newman in a death that occurred in Mexico.

Subsequently, he has appeared in numerous films and theatrical productions as well as hundreds of hours of television on such notable shows as Private Practice, House, Without a Trace, Criminal Minds, Mayans M.C., American Horror Story, and Scandal, playing a variety of roles from blood-sucking priests to kind-hearted cops.

Currently 
When not shooting on location, Espinoza makes his home in Los Angeles where he is a father to three young women and a dog daddy to three rescues.

Filmography

Television

Film

References

External links

 Mark D. Espinoza on Linked-In
 Mark D. Espinoza on Facebook

Living people
American male television actors
Hispanic and Latino American people
20th-century American male actors
21st-century American male actors
Place of birth missing (living people)
1960 births